Machi village (MACHI BLOCK under tengnoupal district) is located in India and listed under Taluk : Machi, in the district of Tengnoupal, in Manipur state, India.

It is located 28 km towards North from Chandel District Headquarter.

Machi Village Location

Tehsil Name : Machi 
District : Tengnoupal 
State : Manipur 
Language : Maring
Time zone: IST (UTC+5:30) 
Telephone Code / Std Code: 03848

Pincodes
near Machi Village 795135
Langol village,
Parentong village,
Lamlong village,
Khunbi village,
Kakching, 795148 
Wangjing, Manipur, 795131 (Moreh)

Places near Machi Village

Places
Itanagar- 326 km
Khonsa- 344 km
Changlang- 372 km
Ziro- 378 km
Tirap- 379 km

Cities
Kakching- 24 km
Thoubal- 40 km
Mayang Imphal- 29 km
Lilong- 50 km

Taluks
Machi- 3 km
Kakching- 16 km
Thoubal- 20 km
Imphal East Ii- 21 km

Airports
Imphal Municipal Airport- 41 km
Kumbhirgram Airport- 140 km
Dimapur Airport- 175 km
Aizawl Airport- 191 km

District Headquarters
Thoubal- 20 km
Chandel- 35 km
Imphal West- 44 km
Bishnupur- 47 km

References

Villages in Tengnoupal district